The 2015 season was Felda United's 9th competitive season and 5th consecutive season in the top flight of Malaysian football, Liga Super.

Players

First-team squad

Transfers

1st leg

In:

Out:

2nd leg

In:

Out:

Competitions

Malaysia Super League

League table

Malaysia FA Cup

Round of 32

Malaysia Cup

Group stage

Knockout phase

References

Malaysian football clubs 2015 season